Whitburn Church of England Academy is a coeducational secondary school and sixth form located in Whitburn, South Tyneside. Its motto is "Excellence for all". The academy was known as Whitburn Comprehensive School before moving and receiving major upgrades funded by the Church of England. It has specialist status in maths and computing and is a national teaching school.

Sixth form
The academy has had plans to open a sixth form college for many years. Building work started in January 2015 and the building opened in September of the same year.

Academic performance
The school performs well above the local authority average has held the best GCSE and AS/A level scores in South Tyneside. As of 2015, the school is listed as the second highest in Tyne and Wear

At GCSE in 2010, the school came first in the local authority area, above the England average. The school repeated the success in 2014. Ofsted has rated the school as outstanding

In 2016, 86% of pupils gained a grade C or above at GCSE level in English and Maths.

Multi-academy trust 
In October 2016, Whitburn expressed an interest in transitioning from single to multi-academy trust status. It later joined the PBTSA and Benedict Biscop Church of England Academy and Whitburn Church of England Academy were selected by the National College for Teaching and Leadership (NCTL) to play a leading role in Prince Bishops Teaching School Alliance.

References

Secondary schools in the Metropolitan Borough of South Tyneside
Academies in the Metropolitan Borough of South Tyneside
Church of England secondary schools in the Diocese of Durham